B. japonicum  may refer to:
 Blepharisma japonicum, a protozoan species
 Bradyrhizobium japonicum, a bacterium species
 Bulbophyllum japonicum, an orchid species
 , a fern species

See also